Vijay Kashi is an Indian actor in the Kannada film industry. Some of his notable films are Undu Hoda Kondu Hoda (1992), Mangalyam Tantunanena (1998), Suryavamsha (1999).

Personal life
Vijay Kashi is married to Vyjayanthi Kashi. They have a daughter named Prateeksha Kashi. Both Vyjayanthi Kashi and Prateeksha Kashi are Indian classical dancers, a Kuchipudi exponents.

Career
Vijay Kashi has been part of more than 65 movies in Kannada. Born in Sagara, Karnataka.

Selected filmography

 Sri Satyanarayana Pooja Phala (1990)
 Shabarimale Swamy Ayyappa (1990)
 Bhagyada Lakshmi Baramma (1986)
 Suprabhatha (1988)
 Shanthi Nivasa (1988)
 Krishna Rukmini (1988)
 Undu Hoda Kondu Hoda (1992)
 Mangalyam Tantunanena (1998)
 Surya Vamsha (1999)

See also

List of people from Karnataka
Cinema of Karnataka

References

External links
 

Male actors in Kannada cinema
Indian male film actors
Male actors from Karnataka
20th-century Indian male actors
21st-century Indian male actors
Living people
Year of birth missing (living people)
Place of birth missing (living people)